The Canton of Saulzais-le-Potier is a former canton situated in the Cher département and in the Centre region of France. It was disbanded following the French canton reorganisation which came into effect in March 2015. It consisted of 11 communes, which joined the canton of Châteaumeillant in 2015. It had 3,526 inhabitants (2012).

Geography 
An area of forestry and farming in the southern part of the arrondissement of Saint-Amand-Montrond centred on the town of Saulzais-le-Potier. The altitude varies from 152m at Saint-Georges-de-Poisieux to 367m at Vesdun, with an average altitude of 228m.

The canton comprised 11 communes:

Ainay-le-Vieil
Arcomps
La Celette
Épineuil-le-Fleuriel
Faverdines
Loye-sur-Arnon
La Perche
Saint-Georges-de-Poisieux
Saint-Vitte
Saulzais-le-Potier
Vesdun

Population

See also 
 Arrondissements of the Cher department
 Cantons of the Cher department
 Communes of the Cher department

References

Saulzais-le-Potier
2015 disestablishments in France
States and territories disestablished in 2015